Yunusari is a Local Government Area in Yobe State, Nigeria. It shares a border in the north with The Republic of Niger.

Landscape 
It has an area of 3,790 km.

Population 
It has a total population of 125,821 at the 2006 census.

Postal Code 
The postal code of the area is 632.

Economy 
Agriculture i.e. production of crops like millet, beans, maize, sorghum, ground nut as well as rearing of animals are the main business of people in the Local Government. The main environmental impacts include wind erosion, desertification, deforestation and so on. The local government faces serious effects of climate change.

See also 
 List of Local Government Areas in Yobe State

References

Local Government Areas in Yobe State